Flute By-Laws is the second album by jazz flautist Hubert Laws, released in 1966 on Atlantic Records.

Track listing
All tracks composed by Hubert Laws
"Bloodshot"
"Miedo"
"Mean Lene"
"No You'd Better Not"
"Let Her Go"	
"Strange Girl"	
"Baila Cinderella"

Personnel
Hubert Laws - Flute, Piccolo
Marty Banks - Trumpet, Flugelhorn
Jimmy Owens - Trumpet, Flugelhorn
Garnett Brown - Trombone
Carmelo Garcia - Timbales
Benny Powell - Trombone, Bass Trombone
Chris White - Bass
Ray Lucas - Drums
Victor Pantoja - Conga
Rodgers Grant - Piano
Chick Corea - Piano
Tom McIntosh - Trombone
Bobby Thomas - 	Drums
Richard Davis - Bass
Cachao López - bass
Raymond Orchart - Conga
Bill Fitch - Percussion
Sam Brown - Guitar

References

1966 albums
Atlantic Records albums
Hubert Laws albums
Albums produced by Joel Dorn